Maksym Vitaliyovych Kuchynskyi (born 28 June 1988) is a professional Ukrainian football goalkeeper who plays for 1. FC Tatran Prešov in the Slovak 2. Liga.

Career
Kuchynskyi is a product of the Metalurh Zaporizhzhia Youth Sportive School System in his native Zaporizhzhia. He spent his career in the Ukrainian Second League and Ukrainian First League, but in summer 2018 signed a contract with the Ukrainian Premier League club Karpaty.

He made his debut for Karpaty Lviv in the Ukrainian Premier League in the match against Oleksandriya on 22 July 2018.

He was called up to the Ukraine national under-19 football team in March 2007, and spent 3 matches for this representation.

Personal life
His father Vitaliy Kuchynskyi was an amateur football player.

References

External links 
 
 

1988 births
Living people
Footballers from Zaporizhzhia
Ukrainian footballers
Association football goalkeepers
Ukrainian Premier League players
Ukrainian First League players
Ukrainian Second League players
Ukrainian Amateur Football Championship players
Ukrainian expatriate footballers
Expatriate footballers in Georgia (country)
Ukrainian expatriate sportspeople in Georgia (country)
Expatriate footballers in Latvia
Ukrainian expatriate sportspeople in Latvia
Expatriate footballers in the Czech Republic
Ukrainian expatriate sportspeople in the Czech Republic
FC Metalurh-2 Zaporizhzhia players
FC Metalurh Zaporizhzhia players
FC Zirka Kropyvnytskyi players
FC Desna Chernihiv players
FC Poltava players
FC Cherkashchyna players
FC Karpaty Lviv players
FC Dinamo Batumi players
1. SC Znojmo players
1. FC Tatran Prešov players
2. Liga (Slovakia) players
Ukraine youth international footballers